Corput is a Dutch and Belgian family name. Notable persons with that name include:

 Édouard van den Corput (1821–1908), Belgian professor of medicine
 Henri-Joseph van den Corput (1790–1841), Belgian pharmacologist
 Johannes van der Corput (1890–1975), Dutch mathematician
 Max Corput (died 1911), Belgian-American architect and soldier
Robbert van de Corput, Dutch DJ